Matteo Arena (born 14 January 1999) is an Italian football player. He plays for  club SPAL.

Club career
Arena began his senior career in the fifth-tier Eccellenza. For the 2018–19 season, he joined Foggia, where he played for the Under-19 squad, remaining on the bench in senior squad's games in Serie B. He then played for three Serie C seasons with Monopoli.

On 16 July 2022, Arena signed a three-year contract with SPAL in Serie B. He made his Serie B debut for SPAL on 14 August 2022 in a game against Reggina.

References

External links
 

1999 births
Sportspeople from the Metropolitan City of Bari
Footballers from Apulia
Living people
Italian footballers
Association football defenders
Calcio Foggia 1920 players
S.S. Monopoli 1966 players
S.P.A.L. players
Serie C players
Serie B players